The first series of the British version of The Masked Singer premiered on ITV on 4 January 2020, and concluded on 15 February 2020. The series was won by singer Nicola Roberts as "Queen Bee", with comedian Jason Manford finishing second as "Hedgehog", and singer Katherine Jenkins placing third as "Octopus".

Production
On 31 May 2019, it was announced that ITV was producing a local version of the South Korean television singing competition King of Mask Singer, originally broadcast by the Munhwa Broadcasting Corporation, for the British television market. The production is made by British television production company Bandicoot, part of the Argonon Group.

Panellists and host

Following the announcement of the series, it was confirmed by ITV that the panel would consist of presenter and comedian Jonathan Ross, television presenter Davina McCall, US actor and comedian Ken Jeong (who is also a panellist on the American version of the programme), and singer-songwriter and actress Rita Ora. It was also confirmed that Joel Dommett would host the show.

In episode five, Donny Osmond, who appeared as Peacock in the first American series, took Jeong's place on the panel. In episode six, Sharon Osbourne and daughter Kelly Osbourne, the latter of whom appeared as Ladybug in the second American series, filled in.

Contestants

Episodes

Episode 1 (4 January)

Episode 2 (5 January)

Episode 3 (11 January)

Episode 4 (18 January)

Episode 5 (25 January)

Episode 6 (1 February)
Group number: "High Hopes" by Panic! at the Disco

Episode 7: Semi-final (8 February)
Group number: "Don't Get Me Wrong" by The Pretenders

Episode 8: Final (15 February)
Group number: "The Greatest Show" from The Greatest Showman

Ratings
Official ratings are taken from BARB, utilising the four-screen dashboard which includes viewers who watched the programme on laptops, smartphones, and tablets within 28 days of the original broadcast.

References

2020 British television seasons
The Masked Singer (British TV series)